Carmen Brito Alvarado (born 4 August 1947) is a Chilean filmmaker, restorer, and editor. She is best known for rescuing important works of Chilean cinema.

Career
Brito studied at the Film Institute of the Pontifical Catholic University of Chile from 1966 to 1970, specializing later in editing techniques at the School of Arts and Communication of this same house of studies, dedicating herself to work as an editor there from 1970 to 1980.

At the same time, she dedicated herself to the production of a variety of documentaries and the synchronization and assembly of feature films. In addition, she has worked in the post-production and editing of institutional documentaries, television commercials, and other projects.

Brito has also taught audiovisual communication at Duoc UC, and assembly, negative cutting, and post-production at ARCIS University.

In 2013 she received the Pedro Sienna Award for her distinguished career, as well as the FemCine Award.

Filmography

As editor
 Sin título (short documentary, 1974)
 Vías paralelas (fiction feature, 1975)
 Hacia una isla desconocida (documentary, 1983)
 Caluga o menta (fiction feature, 1990)
 The Frontier (fiction feature, 1991)
 Ciudad Lejos (fiction short, 1996)
 El último cierra la puerta (fiction short, 1996)
 Coronation (fiction feature, 2000)
  (fiction feature, 2003)
 Eme como Mistral (fiction short, 2010)
 Buscando Isla de Pascua, la película perdida (documentary, 2014)
 Mocha Dick, la ballena mapuche (documentary, 2016)

Restorations
 La Dama de las Camelias (José Bohr, 1947)
 Three Sad Tigers (Raúl Ruíz, 1968)
 Canta y no llores corazón (Juan Pérez Berrocal, 1925)
  (Aldo Francia, 1969)
 Bajo la cruz del sur (Antonio Berchenko and Alberto Santana, 1947)
 El Húsar de la Muerte (Pedro Sienna, 1925. Restoration from 1995)

References

External links
 

1947 births
Chilean film editors
Chilean schoolteachers
Conservator-restorers
Living people
People from Santiago
Pontifical Catholic University of Chile alumni
Women film editors